The 1972–73 Liga Alef season saw Hapoel Hadera (champions of the North Division) and Bnei Yehuda (champions of the South Division) promoted to Liga Leumit.

North Division

South Division

References
1972-73 Bnei Yehuda 
The last battle Maariv, 6.5.73, Historical Jewish Press 

Liga Alef seasons
Israel
2